Saint Lucia competed at the 2022 Commonwealth Games at Birmingham, England from 28 July – 8 August 2022. It was the team's 11th appearance at the Games.

On July 23, 2022, a team of 13 athletes (ten men and three women) competing in four sports was named. Arthur Langelier and Julien Alfred were the country's flagbearers during the opening ceremony.

Medalists

Competitors
The following is the list of number of competitors participating at the Games per sport/discipline.

Athletics

Men
Track and road events

Field events

Women
Track and road events

Field events

Boxing

A squad of three boxers was entered as of 9 July 2022.

Men

Swimming

Table tennis

Withdrawn sport

3x3 basketball

By virtue of its status as the top Commonwealth Caribbean nation in the FIBA 3x3 Federation Rankings for women (on 1 November 2021), Saint Lucia was originally invited to play in the women's tournament. However, the basketball federation declined the invitation on account of not being able to send an adequately prepared squad to the Games.

References

External links
Saint Lucia Olympic Committee Official site

Nations at the 2022 Commonwealth Games
Saint Lucia at the Commonwealth Games
2022 in Saint Lucian sport